Yoan Wakis Koré (born 16 November 2004) is a French professional footballer who plays as a centre-back for Ligue 2 club Paris FC.

Club career
Koré is a youth product of CO Cachan and Paris FC. On 12 December 2020, he signed his first academy contract with Paris FC until June 2024. He made his professional debut with Paris FC in a 2–0 Ligue 2 win over Nîmes on 21 September 2021. On 11 August 2022, he signed a professional contract with the club until 2025.

International career
Born in France, Koré is of Ivorian descent. He is a youth international for France, having played up to the France U19s.

References

External links
 
 

2004 births
Living people
People from Bourg-la-Reine
French footballers
France youth international footballers
French sportspeople of Ivorian descent
Paris FC players
Ligue 2 players
Championnat National 3 players
Association football defenders
Footballers from Hauts-de-Seine